Cassia may refer to:

Given name
 Cassia, Kezia or Keziah, a female surname of Biblical origin
 the female gentilicium name of the Cassia gens in ancient Rome
 Cassia or Kassia, Byzantine abbess and music scholar
 Cássia Eller (1962–2001), Brazilian musician
 Cássia Kiss, Brazilian actress
 Cassià Maria Just (1926–2008), Catalan abbot
 Cassia O'Reilly, Irish singer-songwriter

Fictional characters
 Cassia, a fictional playable character in Heroes of the Storm
Cassia Maria Reyes, the protagonist of the Matched trilogy by Ally Condie

See also 
 Cassia (disambiguation)

Given names